Maggiora is a comune (municipality) in the Province of Novara in the Italian region Piedmont, located about  northeast of Turin and about  northwest of Novara.

Maggiora borders the following municipalities: Boca, Borgomanero, Cureggio, Gargallo, and Valduggia.

References

Cities and towns in Piedmont